Miss World 1977, the 27th edition of the Miss World pageant, was held on 17 November 1977 at the Royal Albert Hall in London, UK. The winner was Mary Ann-Catrin Stävin from Sweden. She was crowned by Miss World 1976, Cindy Breakspeare of Jamaica. Runner-up was Ineke Berends representing Holland, third was Dagmar Gabriele Winkler from Germany, fourth was Madalena Sbaraini of Brazil, and fifth was Cindy Darlene Miller from United States. Stävin was awarded a $37,000 cash prize as the winner of the pageant.

Results

Placements

Contestants
62 contestants competed for the title.

Contestants who withdrew in protest against the presence of Miss South Africa 

  – Veena Prakash
  – Nur Arifin
  – Sandra Kong
  – Welma Campbell
  – Ingrid Desmarais
  – Ana Melissa (Peachy) Ofilada Veneracion 
  – Veronica Lourdes
  – Zanella Tutu Tshabalala
  – Svetlana Višnjić

Judges
A panel of ten judges evaluated the performances of Miss World 1962 contestants. The judges are:
Joan Collins
Micky Dolenz
Claude François †
Eric Morley †
Robert Powell
Barry Sheene †
Oliver Tobias
.

Notes

Debuts

Returns

Last competed in 1971:
 
Last competed in 1975:

Withdrawals
  - The local pageant renamed Miss Black South Africa and withdrew.
  – Anna Maria Kanakis was disqualified from the pageant, because organizers discovered that she was underage.

Replacement
  – Janice Galea also had the same issue with age requirements, because her age was similar to Miss Italy before the pageant. At the last minute, she was replaced by her successor, and first runner-up, Pauline Lewise Farrugia.

References

External links
 Pageantopolis – Miss World 1977

Miss World
1977 in London
1977 beauty pageants
Beauty pageants in the United Kingdom
Events at the Royal Albert Hall
November 1977 events in the United Kingdom